Tescelin le Roux ( – 11 April 1117), or Tescelin de Fontaine, Tescelin le Saur, Tescelin Sorus, was a Burgundian knight, keeper of a castle on the road from Paris to Dijon, and father of Saint Bernard of Clairvaux.
His castle, which had been largely destroyed, was rebuilt in the 19th century and is now a pilgrimage destination for followers of Saint Bernard.

Family

Tescelin le Roux was born about 1070, son of Tescelin, a knight of the lord of Châtillon and Saruc de Grancey.
The sketchy available evidence indicates that Tescelin was a miles castri, a dependent knight unrelated to his lord.
Alberic of Trois-Fontaines wrote in the 13th century that Tescelin's mother married Fulk, lord of Aigremont, as well as Tescelin's father.
She had a son named Gui by Fulk,

Tescelin is described as having a reddish complexion, almost yellow-haired, commonly known as Sorus, or Le Roux.
William of St-Thierry said he was "a man of large possessions, gentle in manners, a great lover of the poor, of devoted piety, and of an extreme zeal for justice ... He never took up arms except in defence of his own lands, or in company with his lord...".

In 1085 Tescelin married Aleth de Montbard ( – 31 August 1106).
Aleth, also called Alith, Elizabeth or Alix, was daughter of Bernard, lord of Montbar.
Their children were Guy, seigneur de Fontaine, Saint Gerard of Clairvaux, Saint Bernard de Clairvaux (1091–1153), André, Barthélémy, Nivard, Abbé of Hautvilliers and Blessed Ombeline (1092–1141).
A chronicler of Saint Bernard says that his parents were "illustrious by their rank and high descent, but more illustrious by their virtues."

Career

Fontaine-lès-Dijon is a steep, tree-covered hill beside the highway from Paris to Dijon.
Tescelin and his followers were assigned to protect this strongpoint.
A strong house was built on the hill in the 11th century, entrusted to Tescelin le Roux as seigneur de Fontaine.

Tescelin is often listed among the witnesses of ducal donations.
For example, he is found around 1100 at the time of the donation of the lands of Marcennay by Odo I, Duke of Burgundy, who was leaving for Jerusalem, in 1100 and 1101 in the second and third renewals of the donation of Marcennay, and between 1102 and 1111 during the judgment of the ducal court against Hugues de Chatillon concerning the forest of Marcennay.
Tescelin Sorus is among the signatories of a diploma of Hugh II, Duke of Burgundy, in favour of the Monastery of Saint Marcellus at Chalon-sur-Saône.
On 16 February 1106 Tescelin was one of the witnesses when Pope Paschal II consecrated the Church of Saint-Bénigne de Dijon.
He received "between his hands" the donation of the village of Pouilly by his cousin Milon de Montbard around 1113.
Tescelin is among the witnesses of the charter of foundation of Molesme Abbey.

Alèthe died in 1105 and was buried at the Abbey of St. Benignus at Dijon.
The Abbot Jarenton had the images of her six sons engraved on her tomb.
Towards the end of his life, in 1116 Tescelin became a monk.
His death on 11 April 1117 is recorded in  the register of deaths of the Church of St. Benignus at Dijon, where Alith had been buried many years earlier.

Legacy

Saint Bernard was born in what is now the large tower of the present Couvent et Basilique Saint-Bernard.
Tescelin's castle was held for three centuries by the Sombernon family, Tescelin's descendants in the female line.
During the reign of Louis XIII of France (1609-43) the castle was converted into a convent for the Congregation of the Feuillants.
The convent was suppressed during the French Revolution and the building used for a smithy.
The birthplace was restored and transformed from 1881 to 1897.
It has become a place of pilgrimage for followers of Saint Bernard.

Notes

Sources

 

1070s births
1117 deaths
People from Fontaine-lès-Dijon

Year of birth uncertain